Petar Stambolić (12 July 1912 – 21 September 2007) was a Serbian communist politician who served as the President of the Federal Executive Council of Yugoslavia from 1963 to 1967 and as President of the Presidency from 1982 until 1983.

Biography
Stambolić was born in Brezova, Ivanjica, Kingdom of Serbia. He graduated from the University of Belgrade Faculty of Agriculture. 

He had a long career in the Serbian and Yugoslav communist parties. During the Second World War he was member of communist Partisan forces. His notable military engagements include the Partisan attack on Sjenica. His nephew was Serbian president Ivan Stambolić.

Stambolić served as president of the Central Committee of the Serbian Communist Party from 1948 to 1957. During that time he was prime minister of Serbia from 1948 to 1953 and then served as president of the National Assembly of Serbia until 1957 and President of the Federal Assembly of the Socialist Federal Republic of Yugoslavia from March 26, 1957 until June 29, 1963. He also served as the president of the federal executive council of Yugoslavia from 1963 to 1967, and President of the Presidency of Yugoslavia from 1982 to 1983.

He died in Belgrade, Serbia in 2007.

References

|-

1912 births
2007 deaths
People from Ivanjica
People from the Kingdom of Serbia
League of Communists of Serbia politicians
Presidents of Serbia within Yugoslavia
Presidents of the Federal Executive Council of Yugoslavia
Yugoslav Partisans members
University of Belgrade Faculty of Agriculture alumni
Central Committee of the League of Communists of Yugoslavia members
Recipients of the Order of the People's Hero
Recipients of the Order of the Hero of Socialist Labour